Shyaka Kagame (born in 1983), is a Rwandan–Swiss filmmaker. He is best known as the director of critically acclaim film 'Bounty'.

Personal life
He was born in 1983 in Geneva, Switzerland to Rwandan parents.

Career
Before entering cinema, he studied political science. In 2009, Kagame started his film career as an assistant director with Geneva filmmaker Frédéric Baillif. In June 2017, Kagame made his directorial debut Bounty. The film received critical acclaim and screened at several film festivals. The documentary is special due to no voice-overs, interviews or camera faces. The film deals with questions about the identity of black Afro–Swiss people.

Filmography

References

External links
 

Rwandan film directors
Living people
1983 births
Swiss film directors